The AWGIE Award for Stage is awarded by the Australian Writers' Guild at the annual AWGIE Awards for Australian performance writing. The award is for the playscript. To be eligible, the play must have had its first professional production (as distinct from reading) in the previous year.

David Williamson has received the award five times, over the period 1972 to 1988. Andrew Bovell has also won five times (once jointly), over the period 1997 to 2014. Hannie Rayson, Nick Enright and Patricia Cornelius have all won three times.

Award recipients are:
1971: Michael Boddy & Bob Ellis for The Legend of King O'Malley
1972: David Williamson for The Removalists
1973: David Williamson for Don's Party
1974: Dorothy Hewett for Bonbons and Roses for Dolly and Ron Blair for President Wilson in Paris
1975: Jim McNeil for How Does Your Garden Grow?
1976: Not awarded
1977: Steve J. Spears for The Elocution of Benjamin Franklin
1978: David Williamson for The Club
1979: Ron Blair for Marx
1980: David Williamson for Travelling North and David Allen for Upside Down at the Bottom of the World
1981: Gordon Graham for Demolition Job
1982: Ron Elisha for Einstein
1983: Stephen Sewell for Welcome the Bright World
1984: Ron Elisha for Two
1985: John Upton for Machiavelli Machiavelli
1986: Jack Davis for No Sugar and Hannie Rayson for Room to Move
1987: Michael Gow for Away
1988: David Williamson for Emerald City
1989: Paul M. Davies for On Shifting Sandshoes
1990: Nick Enright for Daylight Saving
1991: Hannie Rayson for Hotel Sorrento
1992: Gordon Graham for The Boys
1993: Alma DeGroen for The Girl Who Saw Everything
1994: Nicholas Parsons for Dead Heart
1995: Scott Taylor for Clipped Wings 
1996: Nick Enright for Blackrock
1997: Andrew Bovell for Speaking in Tongues
1998: Andrea Lemon for Rodeo Noir
1999: Andrew Bovell, Patricia Cornelius, Melissa Reeves, Christos Tsiolkas for Who's Afraid of the Working Class and Justin Monjo & Nick Enright for Cloudstreet
2000: Timothy Daly for The Private Visions of Gottfried Kellner
2001: Hannie Rayson for Life After George
2002: Andrew Bovell for Holy Day
2003: Katherine Thomson with Angela Chaplin & Kavisha Mazzella for Mavis Goes To Timor
2004: Stephen Sewell for Myth, Propaganda and Disaster in Nazi Germany and Contemporary America
2005: Melissa Reeves for The Spook
2006: Patricia Cornelius for Love 
2007: Tommy Murphy for Holding The Man
2008: Tom Holloway for Beyond the Neck 
2009: Andrew Bovell for When the Rain Stops Falling 
2010: Tom Holloway for And No More Shall We Part 
2011: Patricia Cornelius for Do Not Go Gentle
2012: Lachlan Philpott for Silent Disco 
2013: Kate Mulvany & Anne-Louise Sarks for Medea
2014: Andrew Bovell for The Secret River 
2015: Donna Abela for Jump for Jordan
2016: Angus Cerini for The Bleeding Tree
2017: Leah Purcell for The Drover's Wife
2018: Michelle Lee for Rice
2019: Kate Mulvany for The Harp in the South
2020: Suzie Miller for Prima Facie
2021: Kodie Bedford for Cursed!
2022: Maxine Mellor for Horizon [original]; Elaine Acworth for My Father's Wars [adapted]

 Also awarded the Major AWGIE Award across all categories

References 

Stage
Australian theatre awards
Dramatist and playwright awards